Tamara Podpalnaya (born January 3, 1972) is a Russian Paralympic powerlifter. She has represented Russia at the Paralympics in 2000, 2004, 2008 and in 2012. Tamara Podpalnaya has won a tally of 4 medals including 2 gold and silver medals for Russia in the Paralympic event since making her debut in the 2000 Summer Paralympics held in Melbourne.

Biography 
She took the sport of powerlifting in 1997 soon after becoming a mother at the age of 23. She was married to Andrey Podpalny who is a weightlifter and a professional powerlifting coach. Her husband has been coaching the powerlifting sport for her since 1997 after giving birth to a daughter. Her daughter, Uliana Podpalnaya is a Para athlete who has also won a bronze medal in the 2016 IPC European Athletics shot put event. Tamara also holds the title of Honoured Masters of Sport of the USSR.

In 2021, she won the bronze medal in her event at the 2021 World Para Powerlifting Championships held in Tbilisi, Georgia.

References

External links
 

1972 births
Living people
Russian powerlifters
Female powerlifters
Paralympic powerlifters of Russia
Paralympic gold medalists for Russia
Paralympic silver medalists for Russia
Powerlifters at the 2000 Summer Paralympics
Powerlifters at the 2004 Summer Paralympics
Powerlifters at the 2008 Summer Paralympics
Powerlifters at the 2012 Summer Paralympics
Honoured Masters of Sport of the USSR
Place of birth missing (living people)
Medalists at the 2000 Summer Paralympics
Medalists at the 2004 Summer Paralympics
Medalists at the 2008 Summer Paralympics
Medalists at the 2012 Summer Paralympics
Paralympic medalists in powerlifting
21st-century Russian women